The name Butchoy has been used for five northwestern Pacific Ocean tropical cyclones within the Philippine Area of Responsibility.
 Tropical Storm Butchoy (2004) (02W) – approached the Philippines.
 Typhoon Rammasun (2008) (T0802, 03W, Butchoy)
 Typhoon Guchol (2012) (T1204, 05W, Butchoy) – struck Japan.
 Typhoon Nepartak (2016) (T1601, 02W, Butchoy) – struck Taiwan.
 Tropical Storm Nuri (2020) (T2002, 02W, Butchoy)

Pacific typhoon set index articles